Nissan's sidevalve engines were based on the Austin 7 engine, with which they shared the  stroke. The series began with a 495 cc iteration for the 1930 Datson Type 10 and ended with the 860 cc Type 10 engine which was built until 1964 for light commercial vehicles. Later versions were called the B-1, before being replaced in 1957 by the OHV Nissan C engine that was essentially a de-stroked version of another Austin design this time the BMC B-Series.

DAT 495 cc
The displacement of the original version was kept beneath a half litre since driver's licenses were not required for such cars after a ministerial decision of 1930.

Applications
1930-1931 Datson Type 10
1932 Datsun Type 11

DAT 747 cc
For 1933, the rule regarding drivers' licenses was changed so that cars of up to 750 cc could be driven without a license. These dimensions are exactly the same as those of the Austin 7.

1933-1934 Datsun Type 12
1934-1935 Datsun Type 13/13T

Type 7
This  engine is a flat-head side valve automobile engine, a supposedly new design which was slightly smaller but also slightly more powerful than the earlier DAT engine. Postwar cars again claimed , at 3600 rpm.

Applications
 1935-1936 Datsun Type 14/14T
 1936-1937 Datsun Type 15
 1936-1938 Datsun Type 15T
 1937-1938 Datsun Type 16
 1938-? Datsun Type 17
 1938-? Datsun Type 17T
 1946 Datsun 1121
 1947-1949 Datsun 2124
 1947-1948 Datsun DA
 1949 Datsun 3135
 1949-1950 Datsun DB-2/DW-2
 1950 Datsun DS
 1950-1951 Datsun 4146 Truck
 1951-1952 Datsun DS-2 Thrift
 1951-1953 Datsun DB-4/DW-4/DV-4
 1951-1953 Datsun 5147 Truck
 1952-1953 Datsun DS-4 Thrift

Type 10
The Datsun Type 10 engine was a  engine is a flat-head side valve automobile engine produced from 1952 through 1964. Later on, the engine's name was abbreviated to D-10.

The engine used a single carburetor. This engine was called the B-1 when installed in the 1958-1964 Datsun Cabstar; this version produces  at 5200 rpm.

Applications
 1952 Datsun DC-3
 1953–1954 Datsun 6147 Truck
 1953–1954 Datsun DB-5/DV-5
 1953–1954 Datsun DS-5 Thrift
 1954 Datsun DB-6
 1954 Datsun DS-6 Convar
 1955 Datsun 110
 1955 Datsun 120
 1956 Datsun 112
 1956 Datsun 122
 1956–1957 Datsun 113
 1956-1957 Datsun 123
 1957-1958 Datsun 124 Truck
 1958 Datsun 114
 1958–1959 Datsun 115
 1958-1961 Datsun Cabstar A20 (B-1)
 1959-1960 Datsun 125 Truck (B-1)
 1960-? Datsun 126 Truck (B-1)
 1961-1964 Datsun Cabstar A120 & A121 (B-1)

See also
 List of Nissan engines

References

Sidevalve

Straight-four engines
Gasoline engines by model